Prime Minister's Office may refer to:

 Prime Minister's Office (Albania)
 Prime Minister's Office (Australia)
 Prime Minister's Office (Bangladesh)
 Prime Minister's Office (Brunei)
 Office of the Prime Minister (Cambodia)
 Office of the Prime Minister (Canada)
 Prime Minister's Office (Denmark)
 Prime Minister's Office (Finland)
 Prime Minister's Office (Iceland) 
 Prime Minister's Office (India)
 Prime Minister's Office (Israel)
 Office of the Prime Minister, Jamaica
 Prime Minister's Office (Japan)
 Office of the Prime Minister (Kazakhstan)
 Prime Minister's Department (Malaysia)
 Office of the Prime Minister (Norway)
 Prime Minister's Office (Pakistan)
 Prime Minister's Office (Singapore)
 Office of the Prime Minister (South Korea)
 Prime Minister's Office (Spain)
 Prime Minister's Office (Sri Lanka)
 Prime Minister's Office (Sweden)
 Office of the Prime Minister (Thailand)
 Prime Minister's Office (United Kingdom)

See also
Cabinet Office (disambiguation)
Office of the President (disambiguation)

Politics-related lists